Alan M. Taylor (born 15 November 1964) is the C. Bryan Cameron Chair in International Economics and Distinguished Professor of Economics and Finance at the University of California, Davis. He is also a Research Associate
at the National Bureau of Economic Research and a research fellow at the Centre for Economic Policy Research.

Early life and career
Born and raised in Yorkshire, Taylor attended Queen Elizabeth Grammar School, Wakefield, and went up to King's College, Cambridge, on an Open Scholarship. In the Mathematical Tripos he graduated as
a Wrangler in 1987 and enrolled at Harvard University on being awarded the Joseph Hodges Choate Memorial Fellowship. At Harvard he earned a Ph.D. in economics in 1992, specializing in economic history and international economics; he studied with and was influenced by Jeffrey Williamson and Maurice Obstfeld. After completing a pre/post-doctoral fellowship in the Harvard Academy Scholars Program, he has held appointments in the economics departments at Northwestern University, the University of California, Davis, and the University of Virginia. He was named a Guggenheim Fellow in 2004. He was appointed at the Bank of England as a Houblon-Norman/George Fellow in 2009–10. He has also held several visiting appointments, including at Stanford University, the London School of Economics, and London Business School. He took leave from academia to be a Senior Advisor at Morgan Stanley in 2010–11 based in New York and London where he worked on global macro and emerging markets. He took up a role as a Senior Advisor at PIMCO in 2019 based in Newport Beach.

Research and publications
Taylor has written or edited 10 books, and more than 80 journal articles, on problems in international economics, trade, finance, growth and macroeconomics, often in combination with his other major field of economic history. He has been a lecturer/visitor with central banks and international organizations, served on many editorial boards, held multiple grants from the National Science Foundation, and has been funded by other grant making bodies, including the Institute for New Economic Thinking. He is the author, with Robert Feenstra, of the widely used textbook International Economics (Worth Publishers).

Economic history of Argentina
In the 1990s Taylor made contributions to Argentine economic history, starting with his thesis research which was awarded the Gerschenkron Prize by the Economic History Association. His work focused on long-term real and financial factors in slow development after 1914, and he challenged the conventional view that relative divergence began only after 1945 in the Perón era and later.
He went on to collaborate extensively with Gerardo della Paolera, with whom he wrote several papers, published one book (Straining at the Anchor, University of Chicago Press), and one edited volume (A New Economic History of Argentina, Cambridge University Press). Their work was recognized with the Cole Prize by the Economic History Association.

The trilemma
In the mid-1990s Taylor began a fruitful collaboration with Obstfeld tackling the evolution of global financial integration and macroeconomics in the very long run. Their work was recognized with the Sanwa Prize and published in several articles and a book (Global Capital Markets, Cambridge University Press).
In 1997, Obstfeld and Taylor were the first to introduce the now-standard term "trilemma" into economics, which is used to describe the macroeconomic policy tradeoff between fixed exchange rates, open capital markets, and monetary policy autonomy. In work with Jay Shambaugh, they developed the first methods to empirically validate this central, yet hitherto untested, hypothesis in international macroeconomics.

Economics of exchange rates
Since the late 1990s Taylor has a strand of work focusing on exchange rate economics. He has written several influential papers looking at the long-run behavior of exchange rates and the purchasing-power parity hypothesis. More recently he has written on the short-run behavior of exchange rates, in particular to evaluate the carry trade and other currency trading strategies. In both short- and long-run settings he has explored the role of nonlinear dynamics in exchange rate determination. His main collaborators in this area have been Obstfeld, Mark Taylor (no relation) and Òscar Jordà.

Credit, financial crises, and the macroeconomy
Taylor's work since the Global Financial Crisis has looked at the role of bank lending as it relates to financial crisis events and recessions. The team of Taylor and Moritz Schularick constructed the first long-run dataset of aggregate bank credit for 14 countries dating back 1870, and in their 2012 paper ("Credit Booms Gone Bust," American Economic Review) they showed not only how credit had grown to unprecedented levels in the advanced economies in 2008, but that throughout modern history rates of credit expansion have been a robust predictor of financial crises. Collaborating with Jordà they have shown that more intense credit booms tend to result in longer and more painful recessions, all else equal, a pattern that is consistent with the deep post-2008 downturns seen in many advanced economies.

References

External links
 Alan M. Taylor's page at the University of California, Davis
 

Living people
1964 births
People from Wakefield
People educated at Queen Elizabeth Grammar School, Wakefield
Alumni of King's College, Cambridge
Harvard University alumni
British emigrants to the United States
British economists
20th-century American economists
21st-century American economists
Macroeconomists
Financial economists
International finance economists
Trade economists
Economic historians
University of California, Davis faculty